Hjördis Olga Maria Petterson (17 October 1908 – 27 May 1988) was a Swedish actress. She appeared in more than 140 films. She was born in Visby, Sweden and died in Stockholm.

Selected filmography

 Perhaps a Poet (1933)
 Eva Goes Aboard (1934)
 Synnöve Solbakken (1934)
 The Song to Her (1934)
 Andersson's Kalle (1934)
 It Pays to Advertise (1936)
 The Family Secret (1936)
 Adventure (1936)
 The Lady Becomes a Maid (1936)
 Snövit och de sju dvärgarna (1938)
 Styrman Karlssons flammor (1938)
 Kiss Her! (1940)
 With Open Arms (1940)
 The Fight Continues (1941)
 Only a Woman (1941)
Lucky Young Lady (1941)
 Lasse-Maja (1941)
 Tomorrow's Melody (1942)
 We House Slaves (1942)
 Dangerous Ways (1942)
 The Sin of Anna Lans (1943)
 Imprisoned Women (1943)
 Dolly Takes a Chance (1944)
 The Serious Game (1945)
 The Journey Away (1945)
 It Rains on Our Love (1946)
 Johansson and Vestman (1946)
 While the Door Was Locked (1946)
 A Ship Bound for India (1947)
 The Bride Came Through the Ceiling (1947)
 Poor Little Sven (1947)
 Sunshine (1948)
 Jack of Hearts (1950)
Living on 'Hope' (1951)
 In the Arms of the Sea (1951)
 Divorced (1951)
 Defiance (1952)
 Bom the Flyer (1952)
 In Lilac Time (1952)
 Classmates (1952)
 The Chieftain of Göinge (1953)
 Hidden in the Fog (1953)
 Stupid Bom (1953)
 Sju svarta be-hå (1954)
 Enchanted Walk (1954)
 Dance in the Smoke (1954)
 Dance on Roses (1954)
Taxi 13 (1954)
 Flicka i kasern (1955)
 The Magnificent Lie (1955)
 The People of Hemsö (1955)
 The Girl in Tails (1956)
 A Doll's House (1956)
 Never in Your Life (1957)
 Bill Bergson Lives Dangerously (1957)
 Miss April (1958)
 Fridolf Stands Up! (1958)
 Sängkammartjuven (1959)
 Heaven and Pancake (1959)
 When Darkness Falls (1960)
 The Pleasure Garden (1961)
 Lovely Is the Summer Night (1961)
 The Lady in White (1962)
 Ticket to Paradise (1962)
 Sten Stensson Returns (1963)
 The Cats (1965)
 The Passion of Anna (1969)
 Andersson's Kalle on Top Form (1973)
 The Adventures of Picasso (1978)
 Children's Island (1980)
 Mask of Murder (1985)

References

External links

 

1908 births
1988 deaths
Swedish film actresses
People from Gotland
20th-century Swedish actresses